Leonard Monteath Thompson (born 6 March 1916, in Cranborne, Dorset, England - died June 2004) was Charles J. Stillé Professor of History Emeritus at Yale and director of the former Yale Southern African Research Program. He is well known for his work on the formation of the Union of South Africa and the two-volume The Oxford History of South Africa, a collaboration with N.M. Wilson., and has written and edited many books, including The Political Mythology of Apartheid, The Frontier in History (with Howard Lamar), A History of South Africa, and South African Politics (with Andrew Prior), all published by Yale University Press.

Life
Born in England in 1916, Thompson was educated in both England and South Africa, and was a Rhodes Scholar at Oxford University from 1937 to 1939. He was a lieutenant in the Royal Navy during the Second World War, and was awarded many medals for distinguished service. After the war, he taught at the University of Cape Town. Thompson was a professor at Yale University between 1969 and 1986, and was the founding director of the Yale Southern African Research Program, directing the foundation from 1977 until 1994. Thompson wrote many books and articles, including "The Unification of South Africa" and "Survival in Two Worlds: Moshoeshoe of Lesotho, 1786-1870". In the 1950s, Thompson was a founding member of the South Africa Liberal Party, although he left the country in 1961, in the wake of the 1960 Sharpeville Massacre. In June 2004, Thompson died after a brief illness.

Publications
 The Unification of South Africa: 1902-1910 (Oxford, Clarendon Press, 1960).
 "Afrikaner nationalist historiography and the policy of apartheid." Journal of African History 3#1 (1962): 125-141.
 Editor, African societies in Southern Africa: historical studies (London: Heinemann, 1969).

 edited with Monica Wilson: The Oxford History of South Africa: South Africa to 1870. Vol. 1 (Oxford: Clarendon Press, 1969).
 The Political Mythology of Apartheid (1986).
 A History of South Africa (1st ed. 1990; 4th ed. 2014 with Lynn Berat).

Further reading
  Saunders, Christopher. "Thompson, Leonard"  in

References

External links
Book Reviews

1916 births
2004 deaths
20th-century American historians
American male non-fiction writers
20th-century American male writers
British emigrants to the United States
British expatriates in South Africa
Yale University faculty
Alumni of the University of Oxford